Art Cowie (September 17, 1934 – November 21, 2009) was an urban planner, landscape architect and political figure in British Columbia. He represented Vancouver-Quilchena in the Legislative Assembly of British Columbia from 1991 to 1993 as a Liberal. He was born in 1934 in Halifax, Nova Scotia.

Cowie was educated at the University of New Brunswick, at University College London and at the University of British Columbia. He served on the Vancouver Park Board and then on Vancouver city council. Cowie resigned his seat in the provincial assembly in 1993 to allow Gordon Campbell to be elected to the assembly. He was president of Sungold Entertainment Corporation and of Eikos Planning Incorporated. In 2003, he was named a director for the North Fraser Port Authority. Cowie lobbied for the introduction of fee simple row housing in Vancouver and built a demonstration project. He died from respiratory failure at the age of 75.

References 

1934 births
2009 deaths
British Columbia Liberal Party MLAs
Canadian landscape architects
Canadian urban planners
People from Halifax, Nova Scotia